Persatuan Sepakbola Sumenep 1977 or Perssu, commonly known as Perssu 1977 is an Indonesian football club based in Sumenep Regency, East Java. The club plays in the Liga 3.

History 
Perssu Sumenep was established on 1977, Perssu Sumenep started their work in the Indonesian League by playing in the Liga Indonesia Third Division. In the 2011/2012 season, Perssu Sumenep, who at that time was ranked 11th in Third Division and they were entitled to promotion to Liga Indonesia Second Division. In its inaugural season in Second Division, Perssu Sumenep ended this season's competition in 6th place. After a change in format, Perssu Sumenep played in 2014 Liga Nusantara.

In December 2014, they were promoted to the Liga Indonesia Premier Division.

In the 2016 Indonesia Soccer Championship B, Perssu Sumenep managed to achieve quite a proud achievement by becoming the third-place under PSCS Cilacap and PSS Sleman, at that time Perssu Sumenep managed to beat Martapura through the penalty shootout.

However, in the 2017 Liga 2, Perssu Sumenep was ranked 6th in group 6, and they had to be relegated to Liga 3 along with 39 other clubs.

Support
Peccot Mania was established on 23 February 2011, as a support group for Perssu Sumenep and Madura United.

Peccot Mania is part of the Suporter Madura Bersatu (SMB), in SBM there are also other groups of supporters such as Tretan Dhibik Pamekasan, Trunojoyo Mania Sampang, and K-Conk Mania Sampang.

Honours 
 Liga Nusantara
 Third-place: 2014
 Indonesia Soccer Championship B
 Third-place: 2016

References

External links 
 

Football clubs in Indonesia
Football clubs in East Java
Association football clubs established in 1977
1977 establishments in Indonesia